Hemophagocytosis is phagocytosis by histiocytes of erythrocytes, leukocytes, platelets, and their precursors in bone marrow and other tissues. 

It is part of the presentation of hemophagocytic lymphohistiocytosis and Macrophage activation syndrome. It has also been seen at autopsy of people who died of COVID-19.

References

Pathology